The Arena Union Elementary School District is a public elementary school district based in Point Arena, California and part of one of only ten "Common Districts" in the state, following a model where two separate legal entities responsible for local public education (typically one for primary education and the other for secondary education) operate with a common board of trustees, superintendent, district office and budget. In this instance, the other entity in the Common District is Point Arena Joint Union High School District. Operating one public elementary school and overseeing a K-12 charter school, it serves over 300 students from Manchester to Gualala and the Point Arena/Manchester Rancherias.

Schools

References

External links 
 
 

School districts in Mendocino County, California
1885 establishments in California
School districts established in 1885